Văn Điển station is a railway station on the North–South railway (Reunification Express) in Vietnam. It serves the town of Văn Điển, a suburb of Ha Noi.

References

Railway stations in Hanoi